Alive is Kate Ryan's third studio album. It was released in 2006, by EMI. Like her last album, "Stronger", this album was released in the U.S. in April 2008. It includes the singles, "Je t'adore", "Alive" and "All For You".

Track listing 
The track list for the album is as follows.

Original edition

Polish special edition w/ DVD
All original edition tracks plus music videos
"Je t'adore" (music video)
"Désenchantée" (music video)
"Alive" (English version) (music video)
"Mon Cœur résiste encore" (music video)
"The Promise You Made" La Promesse (music video)
"Libertine" (music video)
"Only If I" (music video)
"All For You" (music video)
"Alive" (French version) (music video)
"La Promesse" (music video)
"Goodbye" (music video)
"Photo Gallery"

Personnel
Kate Ryan – vocals, backing vocals, lyricist
Jeanette Olsson – backing vocals, lyricist
Lisa Greene – backing vocals, lyricist
BJ Caruana – backing vocals, lyricist
Karen Melis – backing vocals
Niklas Kings – producer, lyricist
Niclas Bergwall – producer, lyricist
Yves Gaillard a.k.a. Yves Jongen – producer, lyricist
Philip Dirix – producer
Eduardo Delvino – producer
DJ Zki – lyricist
Dobre – lyricist
Victoria Horn – lyricist
Eric Le Tennen – lyricist
M. Holm – lyricist
Xcante – lyricist
J.P. Sluys – French translations 
Mårten Eriksson – mixing
Mats Berntoft – guitars
Martin Bylund – strings
Mattias Bylund – string arrangement
Sander van der Heide – mastering
Johan Hendrickx – A&R

References

2006 albums
Kate Ryan albums